Dražen Vrh is a dispersed settlement in the Slovene Hills in northeastern Slovenia. The southern part of the settlement belongs to the territory of the Municipality of Sveta Ana. The rest of the settlement belongs to the Municipality of Šentilj

References

External links
Dražen Vrh on Geopedia

Populated places in the Municipality of Sveta Ana